Pachydictyum is a genus of freshwater sponge in the family Malawispongiidae. It is monotypic and represented by a single species, Pachydictyum globosum. It lives in Sulawesi, Indonesia.

References

Haplosclerida
Monotypic sponge genera
Endemic fauna of Indonesia
Fauna of Sulawesi
Animals described in 1901